Ali Wallace could refer to:
 Ali (Alexis) Wallace, a winner of Miss Oregon in 2015
 Ali Wallace (naturalist), a Malay naturalist who assisted Alfred Russel Wallace on his travels